The Independent was an Australian newspaper published in Footscray, Melbourne, Victoria from 1883 to 1933.

History
The Independent was first published on Saturday 31 March 1883 in Nicholson Street, Footscray. It described itself as a local newspaper for Footscray, Yarraville, Braybrook, Wyndham and The Plains. It was published each Saturday and cost 1 penny.

References

External links
 

Defunct newspapers published in Melbourne
Newspapers established in 1883
Publications disestablished in 1922
1883 establishments in Australia
1922 disestablishments in Australia
Newspapers on Trove